Gowd Gach-e Olya (also Romanized as Gowd Gach-e ‘Olyā; also known as Gowd Gach-e Ālīā, Nāshelīl-e 2, and Nāshelīl-e Do) is a village in Holayjan Rural District, in the Central District of Izeh County, Khuzestan Province, Iran. At the 2006 census, its population was 250, in 46 families.

References 

Populated places in Izeh County